Vokia is a surname. Notable people with the surname include:

 Ethel Lency Vokia, Solomon Islands politician
 Jaimie Vokia, Solomon Islands politician